Debdieba (Maltese: Id-Debdieba) is a megalithic temple in Luqa, Malta dating to around 3000–2500 BC. They were first excavated by Sir Themi Zammit in 1914. Although most of the remains were destroyed, the excavation found several fragments of pottery. The majority of the site was buried in the 1960s due to the construction of an extension to the runway of Luqa airport. Concerns whether the site was destroyed were raised in 2007 by Lufthansa Technik while they were building a new hangar. The place was also known as "the place of the echo" by Maltese natives as shouting near the site would produce an echo. This is most probably due to the two hills surrounding the site.

References

Archeological sites in Malta
Luqa